Mickaël Leca (born 4 July 1994) is a French professional footballer who plays as a left-back for Régional 1 club SC Bocognano.

Career
On 22 March 2014, Leca made his professional debut in a 3–2 Ligue 1 away win over Valenciennes, playing the full ninety minutes.

References

External links 
 
 

1994 births
Living people
Association football fullbacks
French footballers
Footballers from Corsica
French people of Corsican descent
AC Ajaccio players
Corsica international footballers
Championnat National 3 players
Ligue 1 players
Ligue 2 players
Division d'Honneur players
Régional 1 players